Lake Lidzbark is a lake in Masurian Lake District of Warmia-Masuria Voivodeship of Poland. Lidzbark Welski, a town, lies at the confluence of the lake and the River Wel.

Lakes of Poland
Lakes of Warmian-Masurian Voivodeship